Ya Comimos is a poetic Judeo-Spanish (Ladino) prayer said after the recital of Birkat Hamazon.  It can be found in some birchonim, some Spanish and Portuguese siddurim and some Haggadot.

This prayer has form somewhat similar to Bendigamos, and shares some elements with the content of the Birkat Hamazon.

External links
Etz Chaim Sephardic Congregation of Indianapolis Birchat Hamazon (Grace After Meals)

Jewish prayer and ritual texts
Judaeo-Spanish